The Boathouse on the Lullwater of the Lake in Prospect Park is in the eastern part of Prospect Park in Brooklyn, New York City. It is situated on the northeast shore of the Lullwater, a waterway north of Prospect Park's Lake and southeast of the Ravine.

History

The Boathouse on the Lullwater was built in 1905-07 to a classical design of Helmle, Hudswell and Huberty, protégés of McKim, Mead and White. It supplanted an older wooden boathouse further north. The classical design contains an arcade facing the Lullwater, with a canopy supported by columns of the Tuscan order. The entablature at the top of the columns contains triglyphs, and a balustrade runs atop the canopy, surrounding it and forming a second-floor terrace. The interior of the Boathouse had double staircases that ascended to a second floor, merging at a landing in the middle. There was a boat-renting office at ground level, between the staircases. The second floor was composed of a dining room with doors opening outward onto the terrace. The terrace received a shed in 1915.

By the 1960s, the structure was underutilized. The boat concession only operated on weekends and the Boathouse was visited by fewer than ten people an hour, even on the busiest summer weekends. At one point in September 1964, the Parks Department was within forty-eight hours of demolishing the Boathouse.

The Boathouse shared many features with McKim, Mead and White's original Pennsylvania Station, whose 1960s demolition had been controversial. The resulting historic preservation movement generated public pressure to save the Boathouse. It was listed on the National Register of Historic Places in 1972.

Though the Boathouse was saved, restorations were deferred for several years. The interior renovations began in 1971, under Commissioner August Heckscher. The Boathouse reopened to the public in 1974, but the exterior terracotta was not renovated until 1979. Further restorations were required in the 1980s under Commissioner Gordon Davis to repair damage from a leaking roof. After twenty years as a visitors center and park ranger headquarters, the Boathouse was restored for a third time in the late 1990s because of deterioration in the terracotta. It now houses the Audubon Center, the Audubon Society's only urban interpretive center in the United States.

See also
List of New York City Designated Landmarks in Brooklyn

References

Buildings and structures on the National Register of Historic Places in New York City
National Register of Historic Places in Brooklyn
New York City Designated Landmarks in Brooklyn
Prospect Park (Brooklyn)